Myōō-in (明王院) is a Buddhist temple in Fukuyama, Hiroshima, Japan.

History
Kūkai states that the Risshū or "Vinaya School", one of the Nanto Rokushū, constructed this temple in 807. The original name of the temple was Jōfuku-ji . 

The major object of worship at this temple, a statue of Eleven-Faced Kannon (Juchimen-Kannon), is estimated to have originated in the early years of the Heian period and no doubt was extant in the 9th century.

During the Edo period, this temple changed its sect affiliation and name to fall under the protection of the Mizuno clan, a clan of daimyōs in the region.

Object of Worship
Juchimen-Kannon – estimated to be carved in the 9th century

Cultural Properties

This temple has two National Treasures and one Important Cultural Property as selected by Japanese government.

National Treasures
 The Main Hall – constructed in 1321
 Five Story Pagoda – constructed in 1348

Important Cultural Properties
 Juichimen-Kannon

Access

Kusadouenocho Bus Stop of Tomotetsu Bus

References
Official Home Page of Fukuyama City

Buddhist temples in Hiroshima Prefecture
Fukuyama, Hiroshima
National Treasures of Japan
Important Cultural Properties of Japan
Pagodas in Japan